Bishop Bože Radoš (born 5 September 1964) is a Croatian Roman Catholic prelate who is currently serving as the third Diocesan Bishop of Varaždin since 1 August 2019.

Life
Bishop Radoš was born into a Herzegovinian Croat Catholic family near Tomislavgrad, but few years later they moved to Kuševac in Croatia, where he grew up. After graduation from school and gymnasium in Đakovo and Zagreb, he consequently joined the Major Theological Seminary in Đakovo in 1983, and was ordained as priest on June 29, 1990 for the Diocese of Djakovo o Bosna i Srijem, after completed his philosophical and theological studies.

After his ordination Fr. Radoš a short time served as an assistant priest in Osijek (1990–1991) and continued his studies at the Pontifical Gregorian University in Rome, Italy with a licentiate of the Spiritual theology degree in 1997. After returning from studies, he became a spiritual director in his alma mater – Major Theological Seminary in Đakovo, almost for twenty years (1997–2016). Meanwhile he had a various another assignments: assistant for the ongoing formation of young priests (1997-2016); lecturer in the Faculty of Theology (1997-2016); and member of the presbyteral council (2013-2016). In 2010 Fr. Radoš became a canon of the Cathedral of St. Peter and St. Paul in Đakovo. 

In 2016 he was appointed as a Rector of the Pontifical Croatian College of St. Jerome in Rome and held this office until 2019. 

On August 1, 2019, he was appointed by Pope Francis as the Diocesan Bishop of the Roman Catholic Diocese of Varaždin. On November 24, 2019, he was consecrated as bishop by Cardinal Josip Bozanić and other prelates of the Roman Catholic Church in the Cathedral of the Blessed Virgin Mary in Varaždin.

References

1964 births
Living people
People from Tomislavgrad
Croats of Bosnia and Herzegovina
Pontifical Gregorian University alumni
Bishops appointed by Pope Francis
21st-century Roman Catholic bishops in Croatia